Gordon David Drummond (born 21 April 1980) is a former Scottish international cricketer who made his One Day International (ODI) debut at the 2007 World Cup. A right-handed all-rounder from rural Perthshire, he took over the captaincy of the national side from Gavin Hamilton in 2010, and continued in the role until resigning in May 2013, retiring from international cricket completely later in the season. His younger sister, Annette Drummond, represents the Scottish national women's team, and the pair began their careers together at Meigle Cricket Club.

References

External links
Cricinfo player profile and statistics

1980 births
Living people
Cricketers from Perth and Kinross
Scotland One Day International cricketers
Scotland Twenty20 International cricketers
Scottish cricket captains
Scottish cricket coaches
Scottish cricketers